The Symphony No. 1 in C minor, B. 9, subtitled The Bells of Zlonice, was composed by Antonín Dvořák during February and March 1865. It is written in the early Romantic style, inspired by the works of Ludwig van Beethoven and Felix Mendelssohn. Dvořák never heard or revised the symphony, because the completed work was lost during his lifetime. It premiered in 1936.

History of the work
Dvořák submitted the score for a competition in Germany, but never saw it again, and always believed it was destroyed or irretrievably lost. He later included the work in a list of early compositions he claimed to have destroyed.

However, in 1882, an unrelated person named Dr. Rudolf Dvořák, a 22-year-old Oriental scholar, came across the score in a second-hand bookshop in Leipzig, and bought it. At that time the composer Dvořák was not widely known: although he had written six symphonies, only one of them (No. 6) had been published and only three of them (Nos. 3, 5 and 6) had been performed. Rudolf Dvořák kept the score in his possession, telling nobody about it, not even the composer.  He died 38 years later, in 1920, when it passed to his son. The son brought it to the attention of the musical world in 1923. Its authenticity was proven beyond doubt, but it did not receive its first performance until 4 October 1936 in Brno, and even then, in a somewhat edited form. The orchestra was conducted by Milan Sachs, who was a Czech but was most notable for his work in opera in Zagreb, Croatia (then part of Yugoslavia).  Following the work's premiere, Hans Holländer wrote a review of the work. He noted that, although the writing was at times awkward, the orchestration was not. He noted that it seemed to be similar in style to Ludwig van Beethoven and Bedřich Smetana.  The symphony was not published until 1961, and was the last of Dvořák's symphonies to be either performed or published.  Unlike many other early compositions, Dvořák never had a chance to revise the symphony, and so it is "particularly interesting as a very early Dvořák orchestral score in pristine condition".

Programmatic content
The title The Bells of Zlonice does not appear in the score, although Dvořák is reputed to have referred to it this way in later years. While some argue that there is no programmatic content, it has been noted that several passages sound much like bells. It was originally conceived as a three-movement work, and the Allegretto was added later. The 658-measure first movement, marked Maestoso — Allegro, is, in the original version, the longest movement of all his symphonic works, owing to a 278-measure repeated exposition section comprising 44 score pages, thereby requiring just under 19 minutes to perform uncut.

Form

The work is in four movements:

A typical performance of the work has a duration of about fifty minutes: the movements are approximately 19, 13, 9, and 12 minutes long, respectively.

Instrumentation
The work is scored for two flutes (one doubling piccolo), two oboes (one doubling English horn), two clarinets, two bassoons, four horns, two trumpets, three trombones, timpani, and strings.

Recordings
The C minor symphony has been recorded various times, but the first recording complete and uncut was made in 1966 by the London Symphony Orchestra under István Kertész as part of his complete Dvořák cycle for Decca/London. Other notable recordings have been by Witold Rowicki, also with the London Symphony (Philips, 1970); the Czech Philharmonic Orchestra under Václav Neumann (Supraphon, 1987), the Berlin Philharmonic under Rafael Kubelík (DG, 1973); and the Royal Scottish National Orchestra under Neeme Järvi (Chandos, 1987).

Notes

References

External links
 Symphony No. 1 on a comprehensive Dvorak site
 
 

Symphony 001
1865 compositions
Compositions in C minor
Dvořák